Switzerland competed at the 1964 Summer Olympics in Tokyo, Japan. 66 competitors, 65 men and 1 woman, took part in 51 events in 13 sports.

Medalists

Gold
 Henri Chammartin — Equestrian, Dressage Individual Competition

Silver
 Henri Chammartin, Gustav Fischer and Marianne Gossweiler — Equestrian, Dressage Team Competition
 Eric Hänni — Judo, Men's Lightweight (68 kg)

Bronze
 Gottfried Kottmann — Rowing, Men's Single Sculls

Athletics

Boxing

Cycling

Five cyclists represented Switzerland in 1964.

Individual road race
 Hans Lüthi
 Erwin Jaisli
 Louis Pfenninger
 Hans Heinemann

Team time trial
 Erwin Jaisli
 Hans Lüthi
 Louis Pfenninger
 René Rutschmann

Equestrian

Fencing

Five fencers, all men, represented Switzerland in 1964.

Men's épée
 Walter Bar
 Michel Steininger
 Claudio Polledri

Men's team épée
 Claudio Polledri, Paul Meister, Walter Bar, Jean Gontier, Michel Steininger

Gymnastics

Judo

Rowing

Sailing

Shooting

Eight shooters represented Switzerland in 1964.

25 m pistol
 Hans Albrecht
 Hansruedi Schneider

50 m pistol
 Ludwig Hemauer
 Ernst Stoll

300 m rifle, three positions
 August Hollenstein
 Kurt Müller

50 m rifle, three positions
 Kurt Müller
 Erwin Vogt

50 m rifle, prone
 Erwin Vogt
 Hans Simonet

Swimming

Weightlifting

Wrestling

References

Nations at the 1964 Summer Olympics
1964
1964 in Swiss sport